Bilal Hajji, sometimes also known as The Chef (at times Bilal "The Chef" or Bilal "The Chef" Hajji) is a Moroccan-Swedish songwriter and record producer. Based in Sweden, of Moroccan origin, he has worked with many worldwide artists and celebrities, such as Jennifer Lopez, Lady Gaga, Pitbull, Enrique Iglesias, Akon, One Direction, Nicki Minaj, Nicole Scherzinger. He has written or co-written many charting hits on the music charts in many International countries. 
His early success came through co-writing songs for Alexandra Burke, Lady Gaga, Sean Kingston, Kat DeLuna and Swedish acts Darin Zanyar and Mohombi. He achieved recognition for his work in 2005, firstly with the Darin song "Step Up", which reached No. 1 in Sweden and later won him both a Swedish Grammy and Scandinavian Song of the Year award.

Later hits written or co-written by him include songs for Jennifer Lopez, Pitbull, Enrique Iglesias, Nicole Scherzinger, Akon, One Direction, Nicki Minaj, Khaled amongst others.

Discography

Albums
(Selective - significant involvement in album)
2005: Darin - Darin
2007: RBD - Hecho En España
2009: Maher Zain - Thank You Allah
2011: Mohombi - MoveMeant
2011: Paulina Rubio - Brava!
2011: Porcelain Black - Mannequin Factory

Singles / Songs
(selective - written or co-written)MusicVF - Bilal Hajji discography
2005
Darin - "Step Up" / "Move" / "Be What You Wanna Be" / "You Don't Hear Me"
2007
RBD - "Wanna Play" / "Cariño mio"
2008
Darin feat. Kat DeLuna - "Breathing Your Love"
Lady Gaga - "Money Honey"
2009
Alexandra Burke - "Broken Heels" / "Dumb" / "The Silence" 
Backstreet Boys - "Straight Through My Heart"
Cassie feat. Akon - "Let's Get Crazy"
Lil Jon feat. Kee - "Give It All U Got"
Maher Zain - "Always Be There"
Pixie Lott - "Rolling Stone"
Sean Kingston - "Fire Burning"
2010
Alexandra Burke feat. Cobra Starship - "What Happens On The Dancefloor"
Kat DeLuna - "Oh Yeah (La La La)" / "Party O'Clock"
Mohombi - "Bumpy Ride"
Mohombi feat. Akon - "Dirty Situation"
Usher - "More" (Remix)
2011
Alex Vorobyov - "Get You" (Eurovision 2011 song for Russia)
Cher Lloyd - "Over The Moon" / "Playa Boi"
Enrique Iglesias feat. Pitbull and The WAV.s - "I Like How It Feels"
Jennifer Lopez - "Invading My Mind" / "On the Floor" / "Ven a bailar (On The Floor)" / "Papi"
Kelly Rowland feat. The WAV.s - "Down for Whatever"
Love Generation - "Dance Alone" (Melodifestivalen 2011)
Melissa Nkonda	- "I Dance Alone" - "Mes aventures"
Mohombi feat. Nicole Scherzinger - "Coconut Tree"
Mohombi feat. Pitbull - "Bumpy Ride" 
Nayer feat. Mohombi & Pitbull - "Suave (Kiss Me)"
Nicole Scherzinger - "Club Banger Nation" / "Everybody" / "Killer Love" / "Poison"
One Direction - "Another World" / "Save You Tonight"
Pitbull feat. Marc Anthony - "Rain Over Me"
Porcelain Black feat. Lil Wayne - "This Is What Rock n' Roll Looks Like" - "Naughty Naughty"
Taio Cruz feat. Pitbull - "There She Goes"
2012
Darin - "Nobody Knows"
Dimitri Vegas & Like Mike & The WAV.s feat. Kelis - "Tomorrow Changed Today (Tomorrowland Anthem 2012)"
Far*East Movement feat. Justin Bieber - "Live My Life"
Havana Brown feat. R3hab - "You'll Be Mine"
Havana Brown feat. R3hab & Prophet - "Big Banana"
Jean-Roch feat. Pitbull & Nayer - "Name of Love"
Jennifer Lopez - "Dance Again"
Jennifer Lopez feat. Pitbull - "Dance Again"
Khaled - "C'est la vie" / "Encore une fois" / "Ana âacheck" / "Bab jenna" / "Samira" etc....
Khaled feat. Pitbull - "Hya hya"
Love Generation - "Just a Little Bit" (Melodifestivalen 2012)
Maher Zain - "Number One For Me"
Nicki Minaj - "Pound the Alarm" / "Starships" / "Whip It"
Paulina Rubio - "Boys Will Be Boys"
Pitbull feat. Enrique Iglesias & Afrojack - "I Like"
2013
Austin Mahone - "What About Love"
Jennifer Lopez feat. Pitbull - "Live It Up"
Marc Anthony - "Vivir Mi Vida"
Colette Carr - "I Don't Wanna Go"
Colette Carr feat. Porcelain Black - "Told You So"
2015
Pitbull feat. Gente de Zona - "Piensas"
2020
Basshunter - "Angels Ain't Listening"

References

External links
Discogs
AllMusic

Swedish songwriters
Living people
Year of birth missing (living people)
Swedish people of Moroccan descent